Silvana Paternostro (born c. 1962 in Barranquilla, Colombia) is a journalist who has written extensively on Cuba and Central and South America.  She specializes in women’s issues, and has also written comprehensively about AIDS, revolutionary movements, underground economies and the intersection of literature, music and other cultural forms with politics and economics.

She is the author of In the Land of God and Man: Confronting Our Sexual Culture, which explores gender roles and the effect of government and religion on women’s lives in Latin America, which was nominated for the PEN/Martha Abrams Award for First Nonfiction.  Her exposé of re-virginization centers in the US appeared in the book Se Habla Español: Voces Latinas en USA, the first anthology of new Latino voices in the United States published in Spanish.

She is a Contributing Editor of Bomb magazine, New York’s leading cultural magazine focusing on interviews between artists, writers, actors, directors, and musicians; and a frequent contributor to The New York Times Magazine, Newsweek Magazine, The Paris Review, The New Republic and numerous other publications.  Her work is frequently translated and re-printed, especially in Latin America.  In 1999 she was selected by Time/CNN as one of 50 Latin American Leaders for the New Millennium.

Her second book, My Colombian War: A Journey Through the Country I Left Behind, mixes memoir with history and reportage to tell the story of Colombia’s 40-year-old civil war and uncover the truth about US involvement in the country.  It was published by Henry Holt in  September 2007.

She was associate producer on Che: The Argentine and Che: Guerrilla, a two part movie based on the life of Che Guevara,  directed by Steven Soderbergh and starring Benicio del Toro. The movie started shooting in July 2007 and premiered at the Cannes Film Festival in 2008.

In 2014, Paternostro's biography of Gabriel García Márquez, Soledad & Compañía, was published in Spanish.  Solitude & Company came out in English in March 2019 in translation by Edith Grossman.  Foreign rights have been acquired in Brazil, India, Russia, Serbia, Poland and China.

References

Colombian journalists
Male journalists
Living people
Year of birth missing (living people)